Alfred Marie Joseph Ghislain Claeys-Boúúaert (alternatively, Claeys-Bouüaert; 31 March 1906 – 9 October 1993) was a Belgian lawyer, colonial administrator and diplomat.
He was acting governor of Ruanda-Urundi from 1952 to 1955. Later he served on the United Nations Trusteeship Council.

Family
Alfred Marie Joseph Ghislain Claeys Bouuaert was born on  31 mars 1906 in Ghent, East Flanders, Belgium.
His parents were Léon Marie Joseph Ghislain Claeys-Boúúaert (1879–1971) and Thérèse van der Straeten (1880–1969).
His paternal grandfather was the lawyer and senator Alfred Louis Fernand Ghislain Claeys-Boúúaert.
He obtained a doctorate in Law.
On 11 January 1936 he married Ghislaine de Patoul (1911–2004).

Career

In 1949 Claeys-Boúúaert was chef de cabinet to Pierre Wigny, the Belgian Minister of the Colonies.
In November 1950 Robert Daniel Murphy, the American ambassador to Brussels, visited the Belgian Congo.
He was accompanied by Claeys Boúúaert, Wigny's Chief of Staff, on a 20-day tour of the main centers of economic activity in the country including several mining operations.

Claeys-Boúúaert  was appointed acting governor of Ruanda-Urundi on 1 January 1952, replacing Léo Pétillon.
On 1 March 1955 he was replaced by Jean-Paul Harroy, the last governor before independence.

In March 1956 Claeys-Boúúaert was an alternate to the Belgian representative to the United Nations General Assembly, Pierre Ryckmans.
He represented Belgium to the Food and Agriculture Organization.
The 21st session of the United Nations Trusteeship Council met from 30 January to 26 March 1958.
Emilio Arenales Catalán of Guatemala was elected president and Claeys-Bouuaert was elected vice-president. 
At the end of the session Arenales said he would no longer represent Guatelama in the United Nations, and Claeys-Bouuaert became acting president for the remainder of the year.
In 1959 Claeys-Bouuaert was part of the United Nations Visiting Mission in Truk. 

Alfred Claeys Bouuaert died in Uccle on 9 October 1993. 
His estate passed to his surviving wife, Ghislaine de Patoul, and his three children, Thierry, Marie- Christine Jeanne and Donatienne.

Notes

Sources

1906 births
1993 deaths
20th-century Belgian lawyers
Colonial governors of Ruanda-Urundi 
Belgian colonial administrators
Jurists from Ghent